The Henry Kater Peninsula is a peninsula on northern Baffin Island, in Nunavut, Canada. It protrudes in an eastern direction into Davis Strait. It's bounded to the north by Arctic Harbour. Further north lies Clyde Inlet. Home Bay borders the peninsula to the south.

It is named after the English physicist, Henry Kater.

Geography
At least between 34,000 and 10,000 BP, Henry Kater Peninsula was ice-covered.

Population
There are no permanent communities on Henry Kater Peninsula, though Wenzel noted some Inuit maintained fixed winter residences in villages on the peninsula up through and during the mid 20th century. English trader and hermit Hector Pitchforth lived on the peninsula, dying of starvation in his home in January 1927.

References

Peninsulas of Baffin Island